George Forquer (1794–1837) was a politician who served variously as an Illinois State Senator, Illinois' 5th Secretary of State (1825–1828) and Illinois 5th Attorney General (1829–1832). He was influential in creating the Illinois State Library, in part from a donation of his own personal collection. He also laid out and founded the town of Waterloo, Illinois.

Forquer was the older half-brother of Thomas Ford, who was the state's governor from 1842 to 1846. The two shared a law office in Edwardsville, and Forquer aided Ford in his early years as a lawyer and judge.

While in the state senate, Forquer proposed a loan of half a million dollars for the Illinois and Michigan Canal.

He is chiefly remembered for an 1836 speech in the Springfield Court House that backfired on him.  Seven Whig candidates for election to the State Legislature were there, as well as seven Democrats. Among the candidates was a young lawyer seeking re-election, Abraham Lincoln.  After Lincoln's speech, Forquer, although not a candidate, asked to speak for the Democrats.  "This young man needs to be taken down" he said, pointing to Lincoln, "and I'm afraid the task devolves upon me."  Forquer was not only a sarcastic, yet effective public speaker, but also one who possessed a "superiority complex", and used both effectively against Lincoln.  In fact, his speech was so successful that Lincoln's allies had feared his career was over.

When Lincoln rose to make his rebuttal, he mentioned that Forquer had accepted the position of Government Land Register from President Andrew Jackson, along with $3,000 a year salary.  The position prompted him to switch parties from Whig to Democrat, and the construction of a fine house in Springfield, complete with a curiosity residents had heard about but never seen, a lightning rod.

Lincoln's reply was blistering.  "Among other things he said, the gentleman commenced his speech by saying that 'this young man,' alluding to me, 'must be taken down.' I am not so young in years as I am in the tricks and the trades of a politician, but, live long or die young, I would rather die now than, like the gentleman, change my politics, and with the change receive an office worth $3,000 a year, and then feel obliged to erect a lightning-rod over my house to protect a guilty conscience from an offended God!"

Forquer Street in Chicago is named in his honor. 

1794 births
1837 deaths
People from Edwardsville, Illinois
Illinois state senators
Illinois Attorneys General
Secretaries of State of Illinois
19th-century American politicians
People from Waterloo, Illinois